Radu Ivan (born 17 July 1969) is a Romanian judoka who competed at three Olympic Games.

Achievements

References

External links

1969 births
Living people
Romanian male judoka
Judoka at the 1992 Summer Olympics
Judoka at the 1996 Summer Olympics
Judoka at the 2000 Summer Olympics
Olympic judoka of Romania
20th-century Romanian people
21st-century Romanian people